High School Rapper (Hangul: 고등래퍼) is a South Korean survival hip-hop TV show, known as a students of high school counterpart of Show Me The Money and Unpretty Rapstar.

Seasons

Season 1 (2017)

Mentors

Finalists

Season 2 (2018)

Mentors

Finalists

Season 3 (2019)

Mentors

Finalists

Season 4 (2021)

Mentors

Finalists

References

External links
 School Rapper 
 School Rapper 2
 School Rapper 3

2010s South Korean television series
Korean-language television shows
South Korean music television shows
Music competitions in South Korea
Mnet (TV channel) original programming
Rapping
Hip hop television